Joe Bullock (born 27 November 1992) is an English professional rugby league footballer who plays as a  forward for the Warrington Wolves in the Super League.

Bullock has spent time on loan from Wigan at the South Wales Scorpions in Championship 1. Bullock played for the Leigh Centurions in the Championship, and on loan from Leigh at South Wales in Championship 1, and the Barrow Raiders in the Championship. He joined Barrow on a permanent deal in  Championship 1, League 1 and Betfred Championship.

Background
Joe Bullock was born in Blackpool, Lancashire, England.

Playing career
He began his career as a winger for Blackpool Scorpions ARLFC before being scouted by Wigan whilst still a junior.

In 2019 he made his Super League début for Wigan against St Helens.

Bullock played in the 2020 Super League Grand Final which Wigan lost 8-4 against St Helens.

References

External links
Wigan Warriors profile
SL profile

1992 births
Living people
Barrow Raiders players
Cumbria rugby league team players
Leigh Leopards players
English rugby league players
Rugby league players from Blackpool
Rugby league props
South Wales Scorpions players
Warrington Wolves players
Wigan Warriors players